= State Eligibility Test =

Indian standardized test

The State Eligibility Test (SET) is a standardised test conducted at the State level by various College Service Commission of the Government of India. The test enables successful candidates to pursue doctoral programmes and contribute to research endeavors within public research institutes and universities across the country.

Additionally, many colleges and universities use the SET as a criterion for appointing assistant professors, with a lower cut-off mark specified state.
